Dangal is a 2016 Indian Hindi-language biographical sports drama film directed by Nitesh Tiwari and produced by Aamir Khan and Kiran Rao under Aamir Khan Productions with Siddharth Roy Kapur under The Walt Disney Company India. The film stars Khan as Mahavir Singh Phogat, a pehlwani amateur wrestler who trains his daughters Geeta Phogat and Babita Kumari to become India's first world-class female wrestlers. Fatima Sana Shaikh and Sanya Malhotra portray the adult versions of the two Phogat sisters, Zaira Wasim and Suhani Bhatnagar their younger versions, Sakshi Tanwar their mother, and Aparshakti Khurana adult version of their cousin, Ritvik Sahore his younger version, all of them except Tanwar and Sahore in their film debuts.

Development on the film began in early 2013 when Tiwari began writing the script. Khan had interviewed the Phogat sisters in 2014 on his talk show Satyamev Jayate, before Tiwari approached him with the script months later, after which Khan became the lead actor and producer. Set primarily in the Indian state of Haryana, principal photography commenced in September 2015 in the neighbouring Punjab. Satyajit Pande served as the cinematographer and Ballu Saluja as the editor. Pritam scored the film's background music and soundtrack, lyrics for which were written by Amitabh Bhattacharya. Kripa Shankar Patel Bishnoi, a coach with the Indian women's wrestling team, trained Khan and the cast for the wrestling sequences.

After a North American premiere on 21 December 2016, Dangal was released worldwide on 23 December and received positive reviews from critics, with praise centered on the film's "honest" depiction of a real-life story and Khan's performance, emotional weight. It was also screened at the Beijing International Film Festival in April 2017 and second BRICS festival in June 2017. At the 62nd Filmfare Awards, it won four awards: Best Film, Best Director, Best Actor (Khan) and Best Action (Shyam). At the 64th National Film Awards, Wasim won Best Supporting Actress for her portrayal of Geeta's younger self. Overseas, Dangal won the inaugural Best Asian Film award at Australia's 7th AACTA Awards, 2017's Best Foreign Film and Top Foreign Actor (for Aamir Khan) from China's Douban Film Awards, and two Jackie Chan Action Movie Awards, and was nominated in the Asian Brilliant Stars category at the 68th Berlin International Film Festival.

Dangal was a commercial success, setting several records at the box office including highest-grossing Indian film, the 28th highest-grossing non-English film, and the 19th highest-grossing sports film worldwide. According to some estimates, it was a one and only Indian film to cross ₹ 2,000 crores gross benchmark The film has also been watched more than million times on Chinese streaming platforms, .

Plot 
Mahavir Singh Phogat, a former amateur wrestler trained in the pehlwani style of Indian wrestling, is a national wrestling champion residing in Balali, Haryana. His average Indian father forces him to give up the sport to obtain gainful employment. Dejected he could not win a medal for his country, he vows that his unborn son will. Disappointed on having four daughters, he gives up hope. But when his older daughters Geeta and Babita come home after beating two boys in response to derogatory comments, he realizes their potential to become wrestlers and begins coaching them.

His methods seem harsh, including grueling early morning workouts and short forced haircuts. Despite facing backlash from the villagers, he goes ahead with them, training them in his makeshift mud pit. Initially, the girls resent their father for his treatment but soon realize that he cares for their future. Motivated, they willingly participate in wrestling tournaments where they defeat boys. Unable to afford wrestling mats, Mahavir uses mattresses and trains them in freestyle wrestling to prepare them for competitive events. Geeta goes on to win the junior and senior championships at the state and national levels before heading to the National Sports Academy in Patiala to train for the forthcoming Commonwealth Games.

Once there, Geeta makes friends and begins to disregard the discipline taught by Mahavir under duress from her coach Pramod Kadam, whose training methods and wrestling techniques completely differ from her father's. Therefore, she loses every match at the international level. During a visit home, she defeats a visibly exhausted Mahavir in a ferocious bout after egotistically mocking him. Babita reminds Geeta of her mistake and that she should respect Mahavir. Soon after, Babita wins the national championship and follows Geeta to the academy. After the two sisters have an emotional conversation in which Babita provides her encouragement, Geeta tearfully makes peace with Mahavir.

Before the Commonwealth Games, Pramod forces Geeta to compete in the 51 kg weight class rather than in her usual 55 kg. Irritated upon learning this, Mahavir goes to Patiala with his nephew Omkar and begins coaching the girls secretly. Learning about this, and furious with Mahavir's interference, Pramod wants the girls expelled; the sports authority issues a warning but allows them to continue. Mahavir is barred from entering the academy, and the girls are forbidden to go out. Determined to continue assisting his daughters, Mahavir obtains tapes of Geeta's previous unsuccessful bouts and coaches her by pointing out her errors over the phone.

At the games, competing in the 55 kg class, Geeta eases her way into the final. Mahavir constantly contradicts Pramod's instructions while sitting in the audience, and she follows her father's instructions instead. Just before the gold medal bout, jealous Pramod conspires to lock Mahavir in a room.

In the bout, Geeta manages to win the first session but loses the second. Trailing 1–5 in the final session and with nine seconds left, she recalls the tactics taught by her father and a 5-pointer, and executes it on her opponent in the final three seconds, taking the score to 6–5 in her favor, thus winning the session and the bout 2–1. In the process, she becomes the first Indian female wrestler to win gold at the Commonwealth Games. Mahavir returns just in time to embrace his daughters, dashing Pramod's hopes of obtaining credit before the news media.

Cast 

 Aamir Khan as Mahavir Singh Phogat
 Sakshi Tanwar as Daya Shobha Kaur – Mahavir's wife
 Fatima Sana Shaikh as Geeta Phogat – Mahavir's eldest daughter
 Zaira Wasim as Child Geeta
 Sanya Malhotra as Babita Kumari – Mahavir's second daughter
 Suhani Bhatnagar as Child Babita
 Aparshakti Khurana as Omkar Singh Phogat – Rajpal's son; Mahavir's nephew
 Ritvik Sahore as Teenage Omkar
 Ananya Sharma as Child Ritu Phogat – Mahavir's third daughter
 Lakshita Goyal as Child Sangeeta Phogat – Mahavir's youngest daughter
 Girish Kulkarni as Pramod Kadam – Coach at the National Sports Academy
 Vivan Bhatena as Harkinder – Mahavir's colleague
 Shishir Sharma as Head of Department of the National Sports Academy
 Meenu Prajapati as Jasmeet – Geeta's friend at the National Sports Academy
 Badrul Islam as Shamim – Owner of meat shop
 Karmveer Choudhary as Maan Singh Phogat – Mahavir's father
 Anurag Arora as Rajpal Singh Phogat – Mahavir's brother; Omkar's father

Production

Development 

Divya V. Rao, a member of Disney's creative team, read a newspaper article in 2012 about Mahavir Singh Phogat, who trained his daughters to become world champions. She thought this would make for a great film, and spoke about this to Kapur and other Disney personnel. Disney approached Nitesh Tiwari to write and direct the story. Tiwari met Phogat and his daughters, who instantly agreed to tell the story. Tiwari worked on the script for close to a year with Gupta, Jain and Mehrotra before going to Ronnie Screwvala, the CEO of UTV Motion Pictures, and Kapur with the final script, while suggesting that Aamir Khan play Phogat.

Months prior to being approached for with the script, Khan had invited the Phogat sisters onto his television talk show Satyamev Jayate, interviewing them on the first episode of season three in 2014. A few months after he interviewed them on Satyamev Jayate, he was approached by Tiwari. Kapur and Tiwari went to Khan with the story, and Khan loved it in its first narration. Khan had just finished Dhoom 3 and had begun shooting for PK. He wanted to do the film after 5–10 years when he would turn 60 because the role demanded him to be 55 and he was still doing younger roles. But the story remained in his mind and a few months later, he called up Tiwari and asked him to narrate the script once again.

After the release of PK in 2014, Khan announced that he would play the role of a wrestler in his next film titled Dangal directed by Tiwari, a cinematic biography of the former wrestler Mahavir Singh Phogat. Khan, who was to produce the film himself with Disney, said to reporters, "Nitesh has written a wonderful story. The topic is very important, it's very dramatic. It highlights the discrimination that is meted out to the girl child in India. The best part is that he has done it in a very entertaining manner. The heart of the story is emotional, but it also has a lot of humor. Raju Hirani has this unique way to tell a story where he says something socially very relevant but he tells his story in a very entertaining manner. Similarly, Nitesh has written a very entertaining lovely script, the dialogues are very entertaining. Each time I listen to the dialogues, I laugh a lot. I cry as well as laugh."

In March 2015, Junior Indian women's wrestling team coach Kripa Shankar Patel Bishnoi was approached by Aamir Khan Productions to train Khan and the entire crew of Dangal. Bishnoi said about the film in a Hindustan Times interview, "Very few Indians encourage women for wrestling, especially because of the uniform. This film will change that perception too. People would hopefully want to see their daughters taking up wrestling as a sport."

Khan lost some weight and took Haryanvi lessons and dialect training for the film. He played two distinct roles in the film: the 60-year-old wrestler Mahavir Singh Phogat, and the 20-year-old version of Phogat. Khan reportedly gained 30 kg and weighed 98 kg to play the role of the older Phogat, and then lost the weight to play the younger role in Dangal.

Casting 
In March 2015, Taapsee Pannu, Deeksha Seth and Akshara Haasan were being considered for the roles of Khan's on-screen daughters. In April, Shaikh and Malhotra were cast as the daughters, who hailed from the Jat community of Balali village of Bhiwani, Haryana. Geeta Phogat had participated in the London Olympics in 2012, while Babita had won the gold medal in the 2014 Commonwealth Games in Glasgow. In June 2015, Wasim and Bhatnagar were roped in as child actors for the film. Khurana was also cast in the film, making his debut after a career as a VJ. Mukesh Chhabra served as the casting director, with Vikram Singh being recruited to play the role of the villain. Khan's nephew Pablo, who is the son of Mansoor Khan, was the film's assistant director. Mallika Sherawat auditioned for a role. In August 2015, Rajkumar Rao, who previously worked with Khan in Talaash, was approached for an important role. After auditioning 70 actresses for the role, Tanwar was brought on as Daya Kaur, the wife of Mahavir Singh Phogat. Ananya was chosen to play Sangita, the youngest daughter of Mahavir Phogat. In October 2015, Vivan Bhatena, who appeared in a key role in Talaash, was selected to play a supporting role in the film. In an interview in January 2017, Rao stated that if Khan had declined the role, the only other choices would have been Mohanlal and Kamal Haasan.

For the film's Tamil language dub, Khan initially approached Rajinikanth to voice his role. Despite Rajinikanth enjoying the film, they both eventually decided against it, as they found Rajinikanth's voice to be too recognizable to go along with Khan's appearance.

Filming 

To prepare for the role, Shaikh and Malhotra watched several videos on wrestling to understand "how wrestlers move, walk, their body language". Both Malhotra and Sheikh went through five rounds of auditions, physical training and workshops with Tiwari and Khan. They were trained by coach and former wrestler Kripa Shankar Patel Bishnoi. From September 2015 to December 2015, Khan gained 9% fat, weighing around 98 kg for Dangal, and from January 2016 to April 2016, he regained the shape that he had opted for in Dhoom 3 and would hear the script for next future films, halting shooting of Dangal for said period.

The shooting schedule of Dangal began on 1 September 2015. The villages of Ludhiana were given a Haryanvi transformation. The shooting took place in the villages of Gujjarwal, Narangwal, Kila Raipur, Dango and Leel in Punjab and Haryana. The village of Dango, which is in the Pakhowal Tehsil in Ludhiana, is veteran actor Dharmendra's ancestral village.

The first scene was shot on 21 September 2015 in Ludhiana with the presence of Mahavir Singh Phogat and his daughters, Geeta and Babita. On 14 November 2015, while shooting in Ludhiana, Khan suffered minor injuries resulting in muscle spasms in his back. On 20 November 2015, Khan collapsed after sustaining a shoulder injury on the set. After his recovery, he resumed shooting in Pune on 9 December 2015.

The team filmed in and around stadiums at the Shree Shiv Chhatrapati Sports Complex in Pune. At the time, the complex hosted the 2015 Roll Ball World Cup, and athletes of the Netherlands national rollball team and Slovenia women's national roll ball team were recruited to play background athletes in the film. The team also shot some portions of the film in Symbiosis International University, Pune.

On 19 January 2016, Khan and the entire crew of the film shot in Delhi, at Talkatora Stadium, to film wrestling sequences. The crew then moved to Thyagaraj Stadium to shoot sequences of Commonwealth Games and National Games. The first schedule of shooting was also done in schools and in Dango village.

The second schedule of the film started on 16 June 2016 at the Akhada Leel near Toosa village, in Ludhiana district. It is one of the largest villages in Punjab. Khan said, "When I came to Ludhiana, I was very fat. At that time, we shot for the scenes where Mahavir has become old. 85 percent of the film is about his 'old' look only. Now we are shooting for the portion when Mahavir was young."

With the film being set in multiple decades, the cinematographer Satyajit Pande and colorist Ashirwad Hadkar experimented with a number of tests for skin tones and costumes during the pre-production stage. Natural light was majorly employed in the film. To portray the 1980s, the "sources [were kept] white-hot and the skin tones yellow-warm" for the day sequences, and "a consistent bulb warm tone was maintained" for the night sequences. With varying colour temperatures in the process of filming over an entire day starting early mornings until late evenings, visual effects plates were used and digital intermediate process employed.

Music 

The music for the film is composed by Pritam, with lyrics penned by Amitabh Bhattacharya in Hindi, Rajesh Malarvannan in Tamil and Rajshri Sudhakar in Telugu. Daler Mehndi sang the film's title track. The song "Dhaakad" was sung by rapper Raftaar and became popular receiving 12 million views, in three days. Khan rapped his own version of the song and included it in the album. The soundtrack album was released on 23 November 2016 in Hindi and 26 November 2016 in Tamil and Telugu, under the Zee Music Company label. The film's soundtrack album is set to have a Japanese release published by Rambling Records on 13 April 2018.

Release 
Dangal was released in the United States on 21 December 2016 and worldwide on 23 December 2016. The film was shown on an estimated 4,300 screens in India and 1,000 screens internationally. It was also released in Tamil and Telugu dubbed versions as Yuddham. It was declared tax-free in six Indian states – Uttar Pradesh, Uttarakhand, Haryana, Chhattisgarh, Delhi and Madhya Pradesh – to promote Beti Bachao, Beti Padhao, a Government of India's social campaign aiming to reduce the selective abortion of females, to protect girls, and to educate them. The film is available as VOD service on popular streaming platform Netflix.

Dangals second phase of release was in the Chinese markets of East Asia, starting with Taiwan on 24 March 2017. Dangal was screened at the 7th Beijing International Film Festival, the first Indian film to be screened at the festival, in the non-competing panorama section in April 2017 as Shuaijiao Baba (Let's Wrestle, Father!), and received a standing ovation. The screening was attended by a number of Chinese celebrities, including actress Liu Yifei and actor Wu Gang. It released theatrically in China on 5 May 2017, on 9,000 screens, "the widest ever release for an Indian film in any territory", and opened to overwhelming response from critics and audiences alike. However, the film was trimmed by 20 minutes "to be in line with what the Chinese are used to." The film released in Hong Kong on 24 August 2017.

In June 2017, Khan announced plans to release the film in Japan and South America. Dangal released in Japan on 6 April 2018, and was the first film to be co-distributed by Disney with Japan's Gaga Corporation. Its Japanese language title is ダンガル きっと、つよくなる (Dangaru Kitto, Tsuyoku Naru), which has some similarity to the Japanese title of 3 Idiots (Kitto, Umaku Iku). A preview of Dangal was held on 25 January 2018 by the Japan Wrestling Association, whose chairman recommended the film as inspiration for the 2020 Tokyo Olympics. Another preview screening was held for the Japan Olympic wrestling team during training camp in February 2018, and was well received by the audience.

Dangal was released in South Korea on 25 April 2018. The film had its South Korean premier on 23 April 2018, which was attended by the South Korean female wrestling team for the 2018 Asian Games.

Critical reception 

Critics often praised the portrayal of the subject matter in Dangal. Rachit Gupta of Filmfare magazine gave the film a full five-star rating calling it "perfect in every sense of the word." He added, "The film's direction and writing is so riveting that it coaxes it's the viewer to stand up and applaud. Great editing and filmmaking technique aside, Dangal features wrestling matches that are authentic and real."
 Meena Iyer of The Times of India called it "inspiring and entertaining" and awarded a four-and-a-half out of five star rating. She commended the writing of being for "tongue-in-cheek quality, peppered with humour and several poignant father-daughter emotions." Shubhra Gupta of The Indian Express gave a three out of five star rating and stated that the film worked on two parameters: that it is a "straight-forward film about a popular sport" and the "strong feminist statement about girls being the equal of boys, if not better, in an area they've never been seen, let alone accepted." Saibal Chatterjee of NDTV gave the film four out of five stars and calling it a "hugely entertaining sporting saga", pointed out that unlike other Bollywood films, Dangal does not "go for broke in terms of melodramatic flourish" and that it refrains from "demonstrative chest-thumping and flag-waving". He felt it blended "humour with intensity, and intimacy with spectacle, to perfection."

Ananya Bhattacharya of India Today gave a four out of five-star rating and wrote, "the fights, emotional turmoil, the father-daughter tiffs, take centre-stage in Dangal." She added, "Tiwari uses every single trope in the book of Bollywood sports films ... with a freshness and expertise seldom seen." Awarding the film a full five stars, Rohit Bhatnagar of Deccan Chronicle called it "an unmissable epic". Terming the narrative "engaging to the core", he drew comparisons to Chak De! India, while commending the acting performances and cinematography. Sukanya Verma of Rediff.com felt that Dangal was "one of those few films that discuss strategy and technique in a manner that's easy and entertaining to grasp". Calling it an "exhilarating creation" and praising the acting performances, she wrote, "the raw, rough, visceral choreography of the fights ... evokes sheer awe". Lisa Tsering of The Hollywood Reporter felt the film is driven by "emotional resonance, technical artistry and compelling performances" while adding that "it's so thrilling to watch. Not only do the family scenes ring true, but Tiwari approaches the wrestling sequences with intelligence and sensitivity."

While commending the acting performances of all the lead actors, most critics focused praise on Khan's performance. Deepa Gauri of Khaleej Times wrote that Khan "puts in such an earnest and inspired performance that [it] will go down in the history of Indian cinema as one of the finest." Maitland McDonagh wrote for Film Journal International that "[a]ll four actresses playing Geeta and Babita are strikingly good, and Khan stands out as the deeply flawed Mahavir." Aniruddha Guha of MensXP.com thought that Khan captured the character's "highs and lows with flourish" and called it a "truly great performance", while adding that "the girls of 'Dangal' are a real find." Rohit Vats of Hindustan Times called it "best performance till date". Raja Sen of Rediff.com felt Khan's character was "both fascinating and flawed" and added that he is "a winner utterly sure of his beliefs who bends the world around him to his will. It is the performance of a lifetime". Baradwaj Rangan of The Hindu noted in his personal blog that Khan brought out the contradicting nature of the character "beautifully" and called it "one of his finest performances." Variety magazine's Owen Gleiberman felt that Khan, despite looking like a "jock version of Salman Rushdie ... with a tight-lipped mask, [he] finds a hundred ways to communicate emotion."

The film had its share of detractors who, while praising the narrative and performances, felt that the concept of feminism portrayed in the film was flawed. They pointed out that the wrestler-father, in pursuit of his goal of winning a medal for the country, trains his daughters against their will. Reviewing for The Hindu, Namrata Joshi wrote that the film despite aiming not to hide "chinks in the feminist armour", it does not explore its "dilemmas and complexities" and only "brush[es] things under the easy nationalistic carpet" by "justifying everything with "nation before the individual" logic." She complained of the "easy celebration of the supposed fall of patriarchy" depicted in the film and maintained that "men actually still remain very much in control." The view was echoed by Vartika Pande, in her "Feminist Reading" of the film for feminisminindia.com, who wrote, "Dangal ends up being a film about a patriarch at the helm who "empowers" women and obviously takes all the accolades." Al Jazeera's Azad Essa, while reviewing the film for Independent Online observed that "the elevation of women is still a manifestation of an unfulfilled male dream. It is the male coach who emerges as the true hero, and not the women." Strong responses on similar lines from a small section of the Chinese viewers met the film, where, following the release, a fresh debate on feminism began. A viewer complained that the film "reeks of patriarchy and male chauvinism".

Criticism was also directed at other areas of the film such as the characterisation of the coach at the academy. Uday Bhatia of Mint felt it was "incompetent and vindictive". Rajeev Masand felt it was "shoddy" and that the "twist in the film's final act ... came off as completely unconvincing". Tanul Thakur of TheWire.in also felt that the coach was "reduced to a caricature" and that "he simply exists because Aamir can become a hero." Thakur wrote that the second half of the film was "repetitive and bloated" and that it uses "clichés ... needlessly trying to inject drama".

In Hong Kong, Nicola Chan of South China Morning Post rated the film 5 out of 5 stars. In Japan, Yuri Wakabayashi of Eiga gave the film a positive review. Yoshika Yamada of IGN Japan called the film a "masterpiece" and rated it 9 out of 10. Zakzak rated the film 4 out of 5 stars. The film has received praise from a number of Japanese celebrities, including film critic Takeo Matsuzaki, television personality Tsutomu Sekine, video game developer Hideo Kojima, manga authors Keisuke Itagaki and Noboru Kawasaki, and athletes including Olympic wrestlers Saori Yoshida and Kazuhito Sakae, professional wrestlers Antonio Inoki and Tatsumi Fujinami, tennis player Shuzo Matsuoka, and weightlifter Hiromi Miyake. Upon release in Japan, it ranked first among early April 2018 releases in audience polls conducted by Filmarks (4.22 out of 5 stars) and PIA (93.3 out of 100).

Box office 

Dangal grossed 716 crore after its initial run. It included 511 crore in India and 205 crore overseas. After it collected a nett of 345 crore over its third weekend from release, it beat the record held by PK for the highest grossing Indian film. 

Dangal became highest grossing Indian film worldwide in July 2017, with an estimated gross of  2,000 crore by some sources, after its second phase of release in China and Taiwan. These numbers could be fake as there are no concrete source for these. In July 2017, a spokesperson for Aamir Khan denied the reports that Dangal has crossed ₹ 2,000 crore worldwide. 

The worldwide distributor share of Dangal was 525 crore . , the worldwide gross of Dangal stood at US$307 million (2,000 crore). Dangal emerged as 30th highest-grossing film of 2016 worldwide and the fifth highest-grossing non-English film of all time. The Movie was marketed by a Mumbai Based company named Spice PR owned by Prabhat Choudhary.

Dangal is the first Indian film to gross $300 million worldwide, and one of the top 30 highest-grossing 2016 films. Dangal is also the highest-grossing sports film, and Disney's fourth highest-grossing film of 2017.

India 
Dangal collected 29.8 crore on its opening day of release in India, and recorded as the second highest non-holiday opening after Dhoom 3. On 9 January 2017, Dangal became the highest grossing Indian film domestically, beating Aamir Khan's previous film PK. It eventually grossed  from all languages in India. The film's footfalls at the domestic Indian box office was 37 million admissions.

Overseas 
Deadline Hollywood reported that Dangal would open in 331 North American screens, the hitherto highest for a Bollywood film, on 21 December 2016. Releasing in 279 theatres in the United States, it collected 282,280 and 42,816 from 24 theatres in Canada on the first day; an overall occupancy of 65 per cent was reported. It grossed 12.4million in North America becoming the highest grossing Indian film there, to be surpassed only months later by Baahubali 2: The Conclusion. Dangal was released in 95 screens across the Arab Gulf countries and was last reported to have collected  from the region.

It was the UK's highest-grossing foreign-language film of 2016, as well as the highest-grossing film in the category of specialised films (foreign-language, documentary and classic films). It also received the highest opening in Australia for a Bollywood film (41 screens), and collected 528,000 in its first weekend, opening at second spot, behind Rogue One. It also collected 460,000 (2.98 crore) in New Zealand.

Dangal emerged as highest-grossing Indian film of all time in international markets, when it had grossed around  overseas by June 2017, during its second overseas phase, while running in Taiwan and China.

Taiwan 
Upon theatrical release in Taiwan, Dangal earned over 3 million and emerged as the number one film there, also becoming the highest grossing Indian film in the region. The film ran in the country for four months, with a final gross 101 times greater than its opening day gross, setting a record at Taiwan's box office.

China 
In China, a nation where Indian films were rarely shown, it became the highest grossing Indian film. It was initially released in six Chinese cities and on Youku under the Chinese title 摔跤吧!爸爸 (pinyin: Shuāijiāo ba bàba, "Let's Wrestle, Father"). It grossed  on opening day, and grossed  in just three days from theatrical release. The collections totalled to 300 crore at the end of day nine from release, taking the overall collections past 1,000 crore, becoming second Indian film to reach the mark.

In its second week, it emerged as the number one film in the country, outselling Guardians of the Galaxy Vol. 2 by 15 million according to China's film ticketing portal Maoyan. In the process, it beat the record held by the 2016 Japanese anime film Your Name for the highest grossing foreign-language non-Hollywood film in China. It held the number one position for the second consecutive week taking the overall collections past 1,500 crore. As the film neared its one-month run, it had a cumulative gross equal to 70 times its opening day figure, breaking the record set by Zootopia (2016), following which the Chinese government gave the film a "rare extension" beyond the typical 30-day window. , Dangal had a cumulative China gross 87 times its opening day haul and 15 times its debut weekend, having been number one for 16 consecutive days and in the top three for 34 straight days, and out-lasting and out-grossing heavily marketed Hollywood movies such as Guardians of the Galaxy Vol. 2, King Arthur: Legend of the Sword, Life, Pirates of the Caribbean: Dead Men Tell No Tales, Wonder Woman and Alien: Covenant. When its worldwide gross reached 1,930 crore on 11 June 2017, it became the fifth highest-grossing non-English film of all time.

, Dangal has grossed about ¥1.3billion in China. Its overseas gross in China more than doubled its domestic gross in India. In China, Dangal became one of the top 20 highest-grossing films of all time, the 8th highest-grossing foreign film, had the most consecutive days with a ¥10 million ($ million) gross (surpassing the 30 days of Transformers: Age of Extinction) and $1 million gross (38 days), was the highest-grossing film in May 2017 (ahead of Pirates of the Caribbean: Dead Men Tell No Tales and Guardians of the Galaxy Vol. 2), and is the year's second highest-grossing foreign film (after The Fate of the Furious). In the month of May, Dangal drew 35 million viewers at the Chinese box office. In 52 days, the film had 44,897,623 admissions at the Chinese box office. Khan's earnings from Dangal were estimated to be , one of the highest paydays for a non-Hollywood actor. This was about 86 times its opening day gross, a record in China's box office history.

Turkey and Hong Kong 
In Turkey, where the film released on 18 August 2017, Dangal grossed US$428,201 .

Dangal released in Hong Kong on 24 August 2017, and grossed HK$5.2 million (4.26 crore) in its opening weekend including previews. It opened at number-two at the Hong Kong box office in its first day, before rising to the top spot the following day. It held onto the top spot at the Hong Kong box office through to the week ending 17 September 2017. It surpassed the US$3 million milestone of Aamir Khan's previous hit 3 Idiots (2009) to become the highest-grossing Indian film ever in Hong Kong, where Dangal grossed HK$24.57 million (US$3.15 million, 20.42 crore) . , the film has grossed 23.1 crore (US$3.5 million) in Hong Kong. On its eleventh weekend, the films gross in the city-state reached about HK$27million, . The film has grossed HK$27,139,998 in Hong Kong, .

Japan and South Korea 

In South Korea, prior to release, the film was number-four at the box office on 24 April 2018, from preview screenings which grossed  (US$144,443). On opening day, 25 April 2018, the film had grossed  ($205,800). It opened at number-three, behind Hollywood film Avengers: Infinity War and domestic Korean film Intention. In eight days, Dangal grossed , equivalent to $389,000. In 15 days, the film grossed , equivalent to $528,000. , the film has grossed , equivalent to $850,000.

Commercial analysis

India 
Despite the hype created by the film prior to its release, it was not expected to perform very well on two accounts. Khan's comment in November 2015 during the ongoing intolerance debate in India had sparked outrage and backlash from certain sections of right wing extremist groups. Despite his clarification that the statement made was taken out of context and publicised, the criticism, primarily on social media, continued to the extent that prior to the film's release, campaigns calling for boycotting the film began, on grounds that Khan was "anti-national". Secondly, after the government of India demonetised India's banknotes in November 2016, film businesses drastically fell owing to the fact that tickets were paid for mostly in cash, more so in the 8,500 single screen theatres of a total of 12,000, which accounted for 45 per cent of the total box-office revenue in India. Following the exercise, it was reported that business fell by 60 per cent and that 700 theatres even shut, including a few that deciding not to renew their licences, converted into wedding halls. The earnings of films Dear Zindagi, Kahaani 2: Durga Rani Singh and Befikre that were released around this time were significantly affected, and their corresponding producers had handed out limited prints to single-screen theatres, to keep losses at a minimum.

However, that neither of the two affected the performance of Dangal was evident in how quickly the online ticketing platform BookMyShow hit its fastest one million tickets booked before the release. An average occupancy of over 60 per cent was reported on the first few days in multiplexes. The film performed well on single-screen theatres as well that saw a surge, after two consecutive years of fall in business accentuated further by the demonetisation exercise. The film proved to be an end to the "dry spell" to cinemas across India. On 25 December, its third day from release, it earned 42.35 crore in India, setting a record for the highest ever single-day earning. After strong performance over its first two weeks, it emerged as the highest-grossing Indian film beating PK over its third weekend.

China 
Dangal performed particularly well in China. This was attributed partly to Khan's popularity in China owing to the success of his previous films 3 Idiots (2009) and PK (2014) there. When 3 Idiots released in China, the country was only the 15th largest film market, partly due to China's widespread pirate DVD distribution at the time. However, it was the pirate market that introduced 3 Idiots to most Chinese audiences, becoming a cult hit in the country. It became China's 12th favourite film of all time, according to ratings on Chinese film review site Douban, with only one domestic Chinese film (Farewell My Concubine) ranked higher. Khan gained a large growing Chinese fanbase as a result. By 2013, China grew to become the world's second largest film market (after the United States), paving the way for Khan's Chinese box office success, with Dhoom 3 (2013), PK, and eventually Dangal. His TV show Satyamev Jayate also had a cult following in China, establishing Khan as someone associated with quality films and committed to social causes.

It was also reported that Chinese audiences could relate to the underlying social theme of Dangal in that it portrayed the success story of sisters in the backdrop of a patriarchal and gender inequal society, much like the conditions inherent in China. Another factor was that the film filled a "vacuum" created by lack of interest among filmgoers due to "poor quality of domestic films" and China's ban on the "wildly popular" Korea dramas on television and streaming platforms due to South Korea's acceptance of the deployment of the American THAAD missile defence system, in August 2016. On the day of its release, 5 May 2017, Dangal had a screen share of 13.3 per cent with 30,000 screenings, much lower than Guardians of the Galaxy Vol. 2, (43.9 per cent), the number one film for the previous week. On its fourth day, the first Monday, it rose to 17.7 per cent, and an occupancy rate of over 33 per cent was reported, as against a highest of 24.7 per cent for Guardians of the Galaxy Vol. 2. Immediately after, aided by word-of-mouth publicity, people reportedly thronged the theatres, and screenings were increased to 35,000 on the second Saturday and 55,000 the following day. During the time, the film began trending in Sina Weibo, where the hashtag #摔跤吧爸爸# (#LetsWrestleDad, the film's Mainland Chinese title) has been mentioned over 470million times. The run continued into its third week with 2.7 million tickets sold on the Sunday. With 27 per cent share in ticket sales, it was the highest earning film in China for the month.

According to Chinese media, Dangal is one of the highest-rated films on Chinese film sites Douban and Maoyan, which helped the film generate strong word of mouth. The film's word of mouth was also helped by discussion generated on Chinese social media sites such as WeChat and Sina Weibo, including discussion surrounding Khan's previous work in film and television, as well as a number of prominent Chinese celebrities recommending Dangal to their fans, including stars such as Deng Chao, Wang Baoqiang, Yao Chen, Feng Xiaogang, Lu Han and Fan Bingbing. According to Maoyan, the film's audiences were 59% female and 41% male, and the majority were in the 20–34 age group.

Since Dangals release in May 2017 through to October 2017, it has significantly out-grossed nearly every Hollywood film released in China during that time, with the only exception being Transformers 5. The big-budget Hollywood films that Dangal out-grossed include Guardians of the Galaxy Vol. 2, Pirates of the Caribbean: Dead Men Tell No Tales, Wonder Woman, The Mummy, Alien: Covenant, Despicable Me 3, Dunkirk, Valerian and the City of a Thousand Planets, Spider-Man: Homecoming, War for the Planet of the Apes, The Hitman's Bodyguard, and even The Foreigner starring Jackie Chan. Dangal also surpassed the China gross of Captain America: Civil War (2016). According to The Beijinger: "In this atmosphere of poor Chinese films, Hollywood franchise fatigue and an ongoing ban on South Korean entertainment, Dangal has made the most of its opportunity to win over the Chinese film market." Its gross in China is notably higher than the gross of any non-English foreign film released in North America, where the highest is Crouching Tiger, Hidden Dragon (2000) with $128million.

Awards and nominations

Home media 
The film has been released on several Chinese online streaming platforms. , Dangal has been watched more than 400million times across three Chinese streaming platforms: nearly 200million on Tencent Video (140million in Hindi, nearly 60million in dubbed Mandarin), more than million on IQiyi (120million in Hindi, over 24million in Mandarin), and over 80million on Youku.

Impact 
Dangal, along with Japanese anime film Your Name (which Dangal overtook as the highest-grossing foreign film), began a new trend at the Chinese box office, with Chinese audiences slowly moving away from Hollywood blockbusters and taking more interest in films from other countries, such as Thailand's Bad Genius and Spain's Contratiempo. , non-Hollywood imports account for 72 per cent ($519.7 million) of the year's foreign film box office revenue so far (723 million), with Dangal alone accounting for 27 per cent. An EntGroup survey in China found that the preference for Hollywood films declined from 61 per cent in 2016 down to 55 per cent in 2017, as Chinese audiences increasingly develop preferences for Chinese, Indian and Japanese films.

Dangal, along with Khan's next blockbuster Secret Superstar, drove up the buyout prices of Indian film imports for Chinese distributors. The success of Dangal and Secret Superstar contributed towards Salman Khan's Bajrangi Bhaijaan (2015) securing a wide release in China, along with Irrfan Khan's Hindi Medium (2017) getting a release in the country, followed by a number of other Indian films in 2018.

The film has also had an impact on Chinese cinema. The film's success has led to Chinese filmmakers becoming more confident in tackling social realist themes concerning Chinese society. The film's influence can be seen in the 2018 blockbuster Dying to Survive, for example.

Dangal has had a political impact, with the film being screened at the Indian parliament in a bid to spread the message of women empowerment. It has also had an effect on China–India relations, with Chinese leader and CCP general secretary Xi Jinping saying he enjoyed the film when he met Indian prime minister Narendra Modi. The film resonated with Chinese audiences, with Diangying Yishu (Film Art) magazine stating, "It is like the story of a Chinese village girl becoming an Olympic champion."

Several critics have noted that the Academy Award nominated American film King Richard (2021) starring Will Smith has a similar premise and plot to Dangal.

Controversies

Political controversies 
There was political controversy upon Dangals release in India. In November 2015, Khan expressed the feelings that he and Kiran had about growing intolerance in India, which led to Khan facing intense backlash for the comments, including violent threats. As part of continued backlash against Khan's comments, there were calls for protests and boycotts against Dangal. In October 2016, the Vishva Hindu Parishad (VHP) called for protests against the film. Following its release in December 2016, #BoycottDangal was trending on Twitter, and BJP general secretary Kailash Vijayvargiya called for protests against the film.

There was also controversy over its release in Pakistan. In response to the Indian Motion Picture Producers Association (IMPPA) banning Pakistani film artists and technicians from working in Indian films, Pakistani theatre owners and exhibitors responded by temporarily putting a stop to screening Indian films. Due to Khan's popularity, however, Dangal was set to release in Pakistan, but the Central Board of Film Censors demanded that scenes featuring the Indian flag and Indian national anthem be omitted.

Award controversies 
At the 64th National Film Awards in 2017, there was controversy over the National Film Award for Best Actor, which the committee awarded to Akshay Kumar for his performance in Rustom, instead of Aamir Khan's performance for Dangal. Committee member Priyadarshan, who has worked with Kumar on several films, gave the following explanation for awarding Kumar instead of Khan:

Similarly, Dangal was not awarded at the 18th IIFA Awards, where Kumar was also not awarded. According to the IIFA Awards organisers:

See also 

 Akhada: The Authorized Biography of Mahavir Singh Phogat published in January 2017.
 Phogat sisters – the sibling group upon which the film was based
 List of Bollywood films of 2016
 List of highest-grossing Indian films

Notes

References

External links 

 
 
 
 

2010s Hindi-language films
2016 films
2010 Commonwealth Games
Sport wrestling films
Indian sports films
Films shot in Punjab, India
Films set in Haryana
Films set in Punjab, India
Indian films based on actual events
Sports films based on actual events
Biographical films about sportspeople
Walt Disney Pictures films
Films featuring songs by Pritam
Indian biographical films
Biographical action films
Telstra People's Choice Award winners
UTV Motion Pictures films
Films featuring a Best Supporting Actress National Film Award-winning performance
Disney India films
Films directed by Nitesh Tiwari
Wrestling in India
Wrestling at the 2010 Commonwealth Games
Cultural depictions of Indian women
Cultural depictions of wrestlers